This is a comprehensive list of songs recorded by the American alternative rock band R.E.M. that were officially released. The list includes songs performed by the entire band only (Berry, Buck, Mills and Stipe 1980-1997; Buck, Mills and Stipe 1998-2011). Side projects, including contributions by solo members of the band, are not included in this list. The list consists mostly of studio recordings. Remix and live recordings are not listed separately unless the song was only released in that form. Album singles are listed as released on their respective album. Only one release is listed per song, except for a couple of re-recordings, like their first Hib-Tone single.

Notes

External links 
 R.E.M. Web Discography - Fan Club Singles

R.E.M.